Scarus quoyi, commonly known as Quoy's or greenblotch parrotfish, is a species of marine ray-finned fish, a parrotfish, in the family Scaridae. It is native to the western Pacific Ocean, where it lives in coral reefs. The species can grow to a length of up to 40 cm.

Distribution and habitat
This species was first formally described in 1840 by the French naturalist Achille Valenciennes (1794-1865) with the type locality given as Carteret Harbour, Lambom Island, near Cape St. George in southern New Ireland in the Bismarck Archipelago.

In Australian waters, it is found in the northern Great Barrier Reef.

References

External links
 

quoyi
Fish of Thailand
Fish of Australia
Taxa named by Achille Valenciennes
Fish described in 1840
Fish of the Pacific Ocean